Monte Simmons (born January 29, 1989) is an American football linebacker who is a Free Agent of the National Football League (NFL). He played college football at Kent State. He was signed by the San Francisco 49ers as an undrafted free agent in 2011.  He was waived by the Indianapolis Colts on August 5, 2013.

Professional career

San Francisco 49ers
On July 29, 2011, the San Francisco 49ers signed Simmons as an undrafted free agent. He was waived on September 3, 2011. On the next day, he cleared waivers and was signed to the 49ers' practice squad.

Philadelphia Eagles
Simmons was signed by the Philadelphia Eagles on March 5, 2012. He was waived by the Philadelphia Eagles on August 30, 2012.

Indianapolis Colts
On October 23, 2012, Simmons was signed by the Indianapolis Colts and placed on the practice squad. He was signed by the Colts to a reserve/future contract on January 7, 2013. On August 5, 2013, he was waived by the Colts. On August 13, 2013, he was re-signed by the Colts.

External links
Kent State Golden Flashes bio
Philadelphia Eagles bio
San Francisco 49ers bio
Indianapolis Colts bio

1989 births
Living people
People from Swissvale, Pennsylvania
Players of American football from Pennsylvania
American football linebackers
Kent State Golden Flashes football players
San Francisco 49ers players
Philadelphia Eagles players
Indianapolis Colts players